South Korea competed at the 2009 East Asian Games held in Hong Kong, China from October 29, 2005, to November 6, 2005.

Medal summary

Gold
 Athletics women's Triple Jump — Jung Hye-Kyung
 Athletics women's Pole Vault — Lim Eun-Ji
 Badminton men's Single — Choi Ho-Jin
 Basketball men's team competition — Chun Jung-Kyu, Han Jung-Won, Joo Tae-Soo, Kim Bong-Su, Kim Hyun-Min, Kim Seung-Won, Kim Sun-Hyung, Park Chan-Hee, Park Hyung-Chul, Sin Myong-Ho, Yang Hee-Jong, Yoo Byung-Jae
 Bowling men's All Events — Hong Hae-Sol
 Bowling men's Masters — Hong Hae-Sol
 Bowling men's Trios — Hong Hae-Sol, Kim Jae-Hoon, Kim Tae-Young
 Bowling men's team of Five — Choi Ki-Bong, Hong Hae-Sol, Jang Dong-Chul, Kim Jae-Hoon, Kim Tae-Young, Seo Sang-Cheon
 Bowling women's All Events — Gye Min-Young
 Bowling women's Masters — Gye Min-Young
 Bowling women's singles — Hwang Sun-Ok
 Bowling women's doubles — Gye Min-Young, Shin Bo-Hyun
 Bowling women's Trios — Hwang Sun-Ok, Jeon Eun-Hee, Son Yun-Hee
 Bowling women's team of Five — Gye Min-Young, Hwang Sun-Ok, Jeon Eun-Hee, Kang Hye-Eun, Son Yun-Hee, Shin Bo-Hyun
 Cue Sports men's English Billiards — Hwang Chul-Ho
 Cue Sports women's 9-ball Pool — Kim Ga-Young
 Dancesport Standard – Viennese Waltz — Lee Sang-Min / Kim Hye-In
 Hockey men's team competition — Cho Suk-Hoon, Han Ki-Moon, Hong Doo-Pyo, Hong Sung-Kweon, Jang Kyu-Yeob, Jeon Byung-Jin, Jeong Yun-Sang, Jeon Man-Jae, Kim Jae-Hyeon, Kim Jong-Hoon, Kim Kwang-Jin, Kim Sam-Seok, Kim Seong-Kyu, Lee Dong-Hyun, Lee Jong-Soo, Park Hyung-Bong
 Hockey women's team competition — Cha Sena, Han Hye-Lyoung, Jang Soo-Ji, Kim Bo-Mi, Kim Da-Rae, Kim Eun-Sil, Kim Jong-Eun, Kim Ok-Ju, Kim Young-Ran, Lee Soo-Kyung, Oh Su-Jin, Oh Sun-Soon, Park Jeong-Sook, Park Mi-Hyun, Tak Se-Hee, Yoo Jung-Mi
 Judo men's -81 kg — Song Dae-Nam
 Judo men's Open — Kim Soo-Hwan
 Judo women's -70 kg — Choi Mi-Young
 Shooting men's Air Pistol — Jin Jong-oh
 Shooting women's Air Pistol — Lee Ho-Lim
 Taekwondo men's -58 kg — Lim Chul-Ho
 Taekwondo men's -62 kg — Kim Yong-Min
 Taekwondo men's -67 kg — Kim Eung-Hyun
 Taekwondo men's -72 kg — Song Ji-Hoon
 Taekwondo men's -78 kg — Kim Jong-Min
 Taekwondo men's -84 kg — Yoo Hee-Sung
 Taekwondo men's +84 kg — Cha Dong-Min
 Taekwondo women's -51 kg — Park Myung-Suk
 Taekwondo women's -55 kg — Lee Hye-Young
 Taekwondo women's -63 kg — Kim Sae-Rom
 Taekwondo women's -67 kg — Seo So-Young
 Taekwondo women's -72 kg — Jung Sun-Young
 Taekwondo women's +72 kg — An Sae-Bom
 Weightlifting men's -77 kg — Kim Kwang-Hoon
 Weightlifting men's +105 kg — An Yong-Kwon

Silver
 Aquatics – Diving men's Synchronized 3m Springboard — Cho Kwan-Hoon, Kwon Kyung-Min
 Aquatics – Swimming men's 100 m Breaststroke — Choi Kyu-Woong
 Aquatics – Swimming men's 100 m Backstroke — Park Seon-Kwan
 Aquatics – Swimming men's 200 m Backstroke — Park Seon-Kwan
 Aquatics – Swimming men's 400m Individual Medley — Kim Min-kyu
 Aquatics – Swimming women's 200 m Breaststroke — Jeong Da-rae
 Athletics men's 200 m — Yeo Hosua
 Athletics men's 400 m — Park Bong-Go
 Athletics men's 800 m — Park Jung-Jin
 Athletics men's Triple Jump — Yoo Jae-Hyeok
 Athletics women's Heptathlon — Lee Eun-Im
 Badminton men's team competition — Cho Geon-Woo, Choi Ho-Jin, Kim Gi-Jung, Kwon Yi-Koo, Shin Baek-cheol, Son Wan-Ho
 Bowling men's All Events — Kim Jae-Hoon
 Bowling men's Masters — Kim Jae-Hoon
 Bowling men's Trios — Choi Ki-Bong, Jang Dong-Chul, Seo Sang-Cheon
 Bowling women's All Events — Son Yun-Hee
 Bowling women's Masters — Hwang Sun-Ok
 Bowling women's singles — Shin Bo-Hyun
 Bowling women's doubles — Jeon Eun-Hee, Son Yun-Hee
 Bowling women's Trios — Hwang Sun-Ok, Jeon Eun-Hee, Son Yun-Hee
 Dancesport Standard – Dance Five — Nam Sang-Woong / Song Yi-Na
 Dancesport Standard – Slow Foxtrot — Nam Sang-Woong / Song Yi-Na
 Dancesport Standard – Quickstep — Lee Sang-Min / Kim Hye-In
 Dancesport Latin – Samba — Jung Jae-Ho / Yoon So-Yeon
 Dancesport Latin – Cha-Cha-Cha — Jung Jae-Ho / Yoon So-Yeon
 Judo women's -52 kg — Choi Keum-Mai
 Judo women's -63 kg — Jeong Da-Woon
 Judo women's -78 kg — Park Jong-Won
 Judo women's +78 kg — Kim Na-Young
 Rowing men's double sculls — Kim Dong-Yong, Kim Hwi-Kwan
 Rowing women's Single Sculls — Shin Yeong-Eun
 Shooting men's 10m Air Pistol — Lee Dae-myung
 Taekwondo men's -54 kg — Cho Seong-In
 Taekwondo women's -59 kg — Lee Sung-Hye
 Tennis women's Double — Kim So-Hung, Lee Jin-A
 Weightlifting men's -85 kg — Cheon Jeong-Pyung
 Weightlifting men's -94 kg — Kim Min-Jae
 Weightlifting men's -105 kg — Kim Hwa-Seung
 Weightlifting women's +75 kg — Lee Hui-Sol
 Windsurfing men's RS:X — Lee Tae-hoon
 Wushu – Sanshou men's −56 kg — Cha Jun-Youl
 Wushu – Sanshou men's −60 kg — Yoo Hyun-Seok
 Wushu – Sanshou men's −65 kg — Kang Yun-Sik
 Wushu – Sanshou women's −48 kg — Kim Ari
 Wushu – Sanshou women's −52 kg — Lee Jung-Hee

Bronze
 Aquatics – Diving men's 1m Springboard — Cho Kwan-Hoon
 Aquatics – Diving men's 3m Springboard — Kwon Kyung-Min
 Aquatics – Diving men's Synchronized 10m Platform — Cho Kwan-Hoon, Park Ji-Ho
 Aquatics – Swimming men's 50 m freestyle — Park Min-Kyu
 Aquatics – Swimming men's 50 m backstroke — Jeong Doo-Hee
 Aquatics – Swimming men's 200 m breaststroke — Choi Kyu-Woong
 Aquatics – Swimming men's 200 m individual medley — Park Min-Kyu
 Aquatics – Swimming men's 400 m freestyle — Jang Sang-Jin
 Aquatics – Swimming men's 800 m freestyle — Kang Yong-Hwan
 Aquatics – Swimming men's 1500 m freestyle — Kang Yong-Hwan
 Aquatics – Swimming men's 4 × 200 m freestyle relay — Jang Sang-Jin, Bae Joon-Mo, Kang Yong-Hwan, Park Min-Kyu
 Aquatics – Swimming men's 4 × 100 m medley relay — Park Seon-Kwan, Choi Kyu-Woong, Jeong Doo-Hee, Park Min-Kyu
 Aquatics – Swimming women's 200 m Breaststroke — Jeong Seul-Ki
 Aquatics – Swimming women's 200 m Individual Medley — Kim Seo-Young
 Aquatics – Swimming women's 4 × 200 m freestyle relay — Kim Jung-Hye, Park Na-Ri, Kim Seo-Young, Lee Jae-Young
 Athletics men's 110m Hurdles — Park Tae-Kyong
 Athletics men's 20 km walk — Kim Hyun-Sub
 Athletics women's Hammer Throw — Lee Jae-Young
 Badminton men's single — Son Wan-Ho
 Badminton men's double — Kim Ki-Jung, Kwon Yi-Goo
 Badminton women's team — Bae Seung-Hee, Kang Hae-Won, Kim Mi-Young, Um Hye-Won, Yoo Hyun-Young, Jung Kyung-Eun
 Bowling men's single — Kim Jae-Hoon
 Bowling women's All Events — Hwang Sun-Ok
 Bowling women's Masters — Son Yun-Hee
 Bowling women's doubles — Hwang Sun-Ok, Kang Hye-Eun
 Cue Sports men's One-Cushion Carom Singles — Im Hyun-Seong
 Cue Sports women's 6-red Snooker Singles — Cha You-Ram
 Dancesport Standard – Waltz — Kang Dae-Sung / Jang Han-A
 Dancesport Standard – Tango — Kang Dae-Sung / Jang Han-A
 Dancesport Latin – Paso Doble — Kim Sung-Min / Kim Mi-Sun
 Dancesport Latin – Rumba — Kim Sung-Min / Kim Mi-Sun
 Dancesport Latin – American Dance Five — Jung Kwang-Ho, Yeo Song-Hee
 Football men's team competition — Kim Min-Kyu, Kim Ho-You, Kim Jung-Kyum, Kim Hyo-Jun, Don Ji-Deok, Choi Myung-Sung, Park Hyuk-Soon, Jung Jae-Suk, Go Min-Gi, Kim Han-Won, Park Jong-Chan, Lee Seung-Hwan, Yoon Won-Chul, Lee Yong-Seung, Lee Jae-Young, Woo Joo-Young, Jeon Jae-Hee, Kang Sung-Il
 Judo men's -66 kg — Cho Jun-Ho
 Judo men's -73 kg — Kim Won-Jung
 Judo men's -90 kg — Kwon Young-Woo
 Judo men's -100 kg — Shin Kyung-Sub
 Judo men's +100 kg — Kim Su-Wan
 Judo women's -57 kg — Park Hyo-Ju
 Judo women's Open — Kim Na-Young
 Rowing women's lightweight Double Sculls — Kim Sol-Ji, Kim Myung-Sin
 Rugby sevens men's team competition — Moon Sang-Yong, Han Kun-Kyu, Jeon Jong-Man, Kim Won-Yong, Hong Jun-Ki, Yoon Tae-Il, Kim Hyung-Gi, Park Wan-Yong, Jegal Bin
 Shooting women's 10m Air Rifle — Gu Su-Ra
 Squash men's singles — Lee Se-Hyun
 Squash men's doubles — Lee Youn-Ho, Lee Seung-Jun
 Squash women's doubles — Son Sun-mi, Kim Ga-Hye
 Squash women's doubles — An Eun-Chan, Kim Jin-Hee
 Squash mixed doubles — Lee Seung-Jun, Kim Ga-Hye
 Squash men's team — Lee Youn-Ho, Lee Se-Hyun, Kim Dong-Woo, Kim Hyun-Dong
 Squash women's team — Son Sun-mi, Park Eun-Ok, An Eun-Chan, Kim Jin-Hee
 Table tennis men's team — Cho Eon-Rae, Lee Jin-Kwon, Jeong Sang-Eun, Seo Hyun-Deok
 Table tennis women's singles — Seok Ha-Jung
 Table tennis women's doubles — Moon Hyun-Jung, Seok Ha-Jung
 Taekwondo women's -47 kg — Lee Seul-Ki
 Tennis men's singles — Jung Seok-Young
 Tennis women's singles — Lee Jin-A
 Volleyball men's team competition — Seo Jae-Deok, Baek Kwang-Eon, Bu Yong-Chan, Lee Seung-Yong, Lee Jae-Mok, Choi Hong-Seok, Sim Hong-Seok, Ko Jun-Yong, Park Jun-Beom, Jun Jin-Yong, Choi Min-Ho, Lee Chang-Han
 Volleyball women's team competition — Pyo Seung-Ju, Choi Eun-Ji, Chae Sun-A, Kim Ji-Su, Park Jung-A, Kim Hee-Jin, Kim Yoo-Ri, Park Sung-Hee, Kim Un-Hye, Lee Na-Youn, Cho Song-Hwa, An Mi-Sun
 Weightlifting women's -75 kg — Lee Ae-Ra

Aquatics – Diving
Men

Women

Aquatics – Swimming
Men

Women

Athletics

Track and road
Men

Women

Field
Men

Women

Badminton

Basketball

Men's competition
Preliminary round (Group B)
 December 2  66 – 74 
 December 4  108 – 67 
 December 6  121 – 72 

Semifinal
 December 8  91 – 59 

Final
 December 11  98 – 97 

South Korea men's basketball team won the  medal.

Women's competition
Preliminary round
 December 2  60 – 91 
 December 4  102 – 51 
 December 6  62 – 78 
 December 7  56 – 91 

Quarterfinal
 December 8  58 – 78 

Bronze-medal match
 December 11  77 – 86 

South Korea women's basketball team gain 4th position.

Bowling

Cue Sports
Men

Women

Cycling

Road

Men

Women

Dancesport

Football

Group B

Semifinal

Bronze-medal match

South Korea men's football team won the  medal.

Hockey

Men's competition
Preliminary round
 December 7  12 – 1 
 December 8  1 – 1 
 December 10  3 – 1 
 December 11  5 – 1 

Final
 December 13   –

Women's competition
Preliminary round
 December 5  9 – 0 
 December 7  0 – 3 
 December 9  8 – 0 
 December 10  4 – 2 

Final
 December 12  4 – 1 

South Korea women's field hockey team won the  medal.

Judo

Rowing

Rugby sevens
Preliminary round
 December 5  12 – 12 
 December 5  39 – 5 
 December 5  12 – 19 
 December 6  19 – 21 
 December 6  24 – 7 

Bronze-medal match
 December 6  14 – 12 

South Korea men's rugby union (sevens) team won the  medal.

Shooting
Men

Women

Squash
Men

Women

Mixed

Table tennis

Men

Team
Participants : Cho Eon-Rae, Lee Jin-Kwon, Jeong Sang-Eun, Seo Hyun-Deok
Group Round (Group B)
 December 2 South Korea 3 – 1 Chinese Taipei
 December 2 South Korea 3 – 2 Hong Kong

Semifinal
 December 5 South Korea 0 – 3 Japan

South Korea table tennis team won the  medal.

Women

Team
Participants : Lee Eun-Hee, Park Young-Sook, Moon Hyun-Jung, Seok Ha-Jung
Group Round (Group B)
 December 2 South Korea 2 – 3 Chinese Taipei
 December 3 South Korea 0 – 3 Hong Kong

Mixed

Taekwondo
Men

Women

Tennis
Men

Women

Mixed

Volleyball

Men's competition
Preliminary round – Group B
 December 3  3 – 0 
 December 6  2 – 3 

Semifinal
 December 7  0 – 3 

Bronze-medal match
 December 9  3 – 0 

South Korea men's volleyball team won the  medal.

Women's competition
Preliminary round
 December 2  3 – 0 
 December 4  3 – 0 

Semifinal
 December 8  1 – 3 

Final
 December 9  3 – 0 

South Korea women's volleyball team won the  medal.

Weightlifting
Men

Women

Windsurfing
Men

Wushu

Sanshou
Men

Women

Taolu
Men

References

East Asian Games
South Korea at the East Asian Games
2009 East Asian Games